Poskam County (Posgam), also Zepu County is a county in Kashgar Prefecture, Xinjiang Uyghur Autonomous Region, China. The county is located on the southern bank of the Yarkand River, also known as the Zarafshān River. Poskam County is bordered to the north and west across the Yarkand River by Yarkant County (Shache) and to the south and east by Kargilik County (Yecheng).

History
In 1921, Poskam County was established.

After the Communist takeover, Poskam (Zepu) County was part of Yarkant Prefecture, which was dissolved and became part of Kashgar Prefecture in June 1956.

In 1990, 'unauthorized' mosque construction in Poskam (Zepu) County was reported in the Xinjiang Daily.

Chinese state media reported that in the early morning of October 24, 1999, two died, two were injured and major property damage was sustained at the Seyli (Saili) Township police office in a terrorist attack.

On the morning of March 4, 2004, a fire broke out in the Kalatuzi coal mine killing at least six people.

On March 12, 2005, several Uyghur students and their teachers were arrested after a fight with Han Chinese outside Poskam Petroleum No.1 Middle School.

As reported by Radio Free Asia, on August 23, 2013, at least six Uyghurs (possibly twelve) were killed and twenty wounded in a raid carried out by about seventy to eighty armed security personnel on a place in Jigdejay village (Jigedaijiayi;  /  ), Kuybagh (Kuiyibage) township near the edge of the desert thought to be a 'terrorist' or separatist training camp and munitions center.

On August 27, 2018, Tong'an Township was established. (See also: Kosrap)

In 2018, Poskam County was among ten counties in Xinjiang named by the Ministry of Commerce as a model rural e-commerce county. The county was also listed as the only county in Kashgar Prefecture reaching the standard for a national-level public sanitation county.

In 2019, China National Petroleum Corp announced plans to close Taxinan refinery.

Geography
The county is between 1215 and 1490 meters above sea level. The land is flat and soil is fertile. Rainfall amounts are low.

Climate

Administrative divisions
The county includes two towns and eleven townships:

Towns ( / )
Poskam Town (Zepu;  / ), Küybagh Town (Kuiyibage;  / )
Townships ( / )
Poskam Township (Bosikamu;  / ), Zhima Township (Yima;  / ), Gülbagh Township (Gulebage;  / ), Seyli Township (Saili;  / ), Ikkisu Township (Yikesu, Yikensu;  /  / ), Tughchi Township (Tuhuqi;  / ), Aqtam Township (Aketamu;  / ), Aykol Township (Ayikule, Ayköl;  / ), Küybagh Township (Kuiyibage;  / ), Buyluq Tajik Ethnic Township (Buyiluke;  /  / ), Tong'an Township

Former administrative division:

County-controlled district
Kuiyibage District

Economy
Irrigation is well-developed in the county, and the county is an important producer of wheat, rice, corn and cotton in southern Xinjiang. Grapes are a local speciality. Industries include mining, machinery, construction and cotton-spinning. As of 2017, Poskam County had 42,405.25 hectares of arable land. On January 14–15, 2020, Kashgar Prefecture officials carried out fourteen lectures in Poskam County on scientific methods of agriculture attended by more than 12,000 persons.

Tourism
A tourist attraction located in the county is Jinhuyang National Forest Park, rated as a AAAAA Tourist Attractions of China according to the official classification for tourist sights.

Demographics

As of the end of 2016, 175,686 (84.1%) of the 208,950 residents of the county were Uyghur, 27,131 (13%) were Han Chinese, 4,463 (2.1%) were Mountain Tajik (China), and 1,670 (0.8%) were from other ethnic groups.

As of 2015, 181,256 of the 223,694 residents of the county were Uyghur, 35,950 were Han Chinese, 4,452 were Mountain Tajik (China) and 2,036 were from other ethnic groups.

As of the 2000 Census, ethnic minorities made up 79.38% of the population of Poskam County.

As of 1999, 75.29% of the population of Poskam (Zepu) County was Uyghur and 20.76% of the population was Han Chinese.

Transportation
Poskam is served by China National Highway 315 and the Kashgar-Hotan Railway.

Historical maps

Notes

References

County-level divisions of Xinjiang
Kashgar Prefecture